The Philippine leaf warbler (Phylloscopus olivaceus) is a species of Old World warbler in the family Phylloscopidae.
It is found in the southern half of the Philippines.

References

Philippine leaf warbler
Birds of the Philippines
Endemic birds of the Philippines
Philippine leaf warbler
Taxonomy articles created by Polbot